Antigonus was a Greek historian.

Antigonus wrote a history of Rome.  It has been speculated that this historian and the "King Antigonus" mentioned by Plutarch, are one and the same.

Notes

Ancient Greek historians
Ancient Greek historians known only from secondary sources